Archibald Gavin Hamilton, Baron Hamilton of Epsom,  (born 30 December 1941) is a British Conservative Party politician. A member of the House of Lords, he served as Minister of State for the Armed Forces under John Major.

Background and education
Hamilton is the second son of the 3rd Baron Hamilton of Dalzell, a Lord-in-waiting to the Queen. The title was originally granted to Hamilton's great-grandfather, John Hamilton, 1st Baron Hamilton of Dalzell, who was a Liberal politician, and had been inherited by his second son, Gavin Hamilton, 2nd Baron Hamilton of Dalzell, also a Liberal politician, before passing to his nephew, Hamilton's father.  His mother, Rosemary Coke, was a daughter of Major Sir John Spencer Coke, son of Thomas Coke, 2nd Earl of Leicester; her maternal grandfather was Harry Lawson, 1st Viscount Burnham.

He is the younger brother of the 4th Baron Hamilton of Dalzell, and was born at Beckington Castle, Beckington, Somerset, which was then his parents' country house. He was educated at Eton College.

Political career
Hamilton was a Conservative Councillor in Kensington and Chelsea from 1968 to 1971. He initially attempted to enter Parliament for Dagenham at the February and October 1974 elections, but was defeated by Labour's veteran incumbent, John Parker.

He won the seat of Epsom and Ewell at a 1978 by-election. He held it until his retirement from Parliament in 2001.

During his Parliamentary career he served as Parliamentary Private Secretary (PPS) to the Secretary of State for Energy (1979–81) and Transport (1981–82). From 1982 to 1984, he was Assistant Conservative Whip. In 1984 he became Lord Commissioner to HM Treasury, a position he held until 1986. From 1986 to 1987, Hamilton was Parliamentary Under-Secretary of State at the Ministry of Defence.

He also served as PPS to Prime Minister Margaret Thatcher (1987–88), Minister of State, Ministry of Defence (Armed Forces Minister, 1988–93) and was created a Privy Councillor in 1991. He was Chairman of the 1922 Committee from 1997 to 2001.

Whilst an MP, he sat on the Standards and Privileges Committee (regarding Ethics of the Lords and Commons) in 1996. From 1994 to 1997, he also served on the Intelligence and Security Committee.

He was knighted in 1994. On 13 May 2005 it was announced that he would be created a life peer, and the peerage was gazetted on 17 June 2005 as Baron Hamilton of Epsom, of West Anstey in the County of Devon.

Since 2015, he has sat on the Joint Committee for the National Security Strategy.

Personal life
Hamilton is a bridge player. He is a member of the Lords bridge team and the All Party Parliamentary Bridge Group.

In 1968, he married Anne Catherine Napier (born 1940), daughter of the late Commander Trevylyan Michael Napier DSC, RN. (1901-30 August 1940) and poet and author Priscilla Hayter (1908–98), who produced books about Napier ancestors, poetry and an autobiography, A Late Beginner, which is still in print. Anne is an accomplished sculptor and painter. The couple have three daughters.

In 2006, their youngest daughter Alice Rose Alethea Hamilton married Dominic Johnson, financier, hedge fund manager, and government minister. 

Hamilton sits in the House of Lords, and is a trustee of Supporting Wounded Veterans  as well as being the president of the Lest We Forget Association.

Arms

References
 Official parliament.uk biography

External links 
 

1941 births
Living people
Conservative Party (UK) MPs for English constituencies
Hamilton of Epsom
Epsom and Ewell
Members of the Privy Council of the United Kingdom
Parliamentary Private Secretaries to the Prime Minister
UK MPs 1974–1979
UK MPs 1979–1983
UK MPs 1983–1987
UK MPs 1987–1992
UK MPs 1992–1997
UK MPs 1997–2001
Younger sons of barons
People educated at Eton College
Knights Bachelor
Hamilton
Life peers created by Elizabeth II